The following is a list of military writers, alphabetical by last name:

A
 Pierre Emmanuel Albert, Baron Ducasse
 Stephen Ambrose
 Raymond Aron

B
 Andrew Bacevich
 Ali Bader Iraq war
 Bao Ninh – The Sorrow of War (about the Vietnam War)
 Thomas P.M. Barnett
 Alberto Bayo – Latin American revolutionary, A Manual of Guerrilla Warfare
 Marc Becker
 Antony Beevor – several books on the Second World War; also on the Spanish Civil WAr 
 Don Bendell – Crossbow, The B-52 Overture, Valley of Tears, Snake-Eater, Criminal Investigation Detachment
 David Bercuson
 Friedrich von Bernhardi
 Eric Arthur Blair (aka George Orwell) – Homage to Catalonia
 Mark Bowden
 John Boyd – inventor of the OODA Loop or decision cycle, Energy-Maneuverability, Aerial Attack Study, "Discourse on Winning & Losing", Destruction & Creation
 Gary Brecher – War Nerd
 Ahron Bregman – books on the Arab–Israeli conflict
 Bernard Brodie
 Don Brown – Treason, Hostage, Defiance, Last Fighter Pilot, Malacca Conspiracy

C
 Tobias Capwell (born ) – American curator, historian of arms and armour, and jouster
 Lazare Carnot
 Caleb Carr – military historian, Lessons of Terror, The Devil Soldier
 Nigel Cawthorne – POW histories: The Bamboo Cage, The Iron Cage
 Chanakya – Arthashastra
 Winston Churchill – The River War, The Gathering Storm
 Robert M. Citino – German Way of War, Quest for Decisive Victory, Blitzkrieg to Desert Storm, Death of the Wehrmacht: The German Campaigns of 1942, Wehrmacht Retreats: Fighting a Lost War, 1943
 Tom Clancy – Rainbow Six, Splinter Cell, Net Force 
 Carl von Clausewitz – military theorist, On War
 Menno van Coehoorn
 John Colomb
 Julian Corbett – Edwardian British Naval theorist, Some Principles of Maritime Strategy
 Anthony Cordesman
 James Corum
 Martin van Creveld – expanded theory of war proponent
 Arthur Currie

D
 Giulio Douhet
 Mikhail Dragomirov – Russian military theoretician
 Pierre Emmanuel Albert, Baron Ducasse
 Gwynne Dyer

E
 Jacey Eckhart
 Jeff Edwards – Torpedo
 Stuart E. Eizenstat
 Alonso de Ercilla – La Araucana

F
 Bernard Fall
 Ferdinand Foch
 Frederick II of Prussia
 Sextus Julius Frontinus – Stratagemata
 J.F.C. Fuller – theoretician of tank warfare
 Paul Fussell

G
 Pierre Marie Gallois
 Azar Gat
 Charles de Gaulle – Vers l'Armée de Métier (1934), La France et son Armée (1938) (partial bibliography of de Gaulle's military writings; influence of de Gaulle's military writings in Nazi Germany)
 David Glantz – preeminent authority on the Red Army during World War II
 Colmar Freiherr von der Goltz – 19th-century general and theorist
 Jack Granatstein
 Lester W. Grau
 Robert Greene – The 33 Strategies of War, The 48 Laws of Power
 George Grivas
 Heinz Guderian – German general, developed principles of Blitzkrieg, Achtung – Panzer!
 Ernesto Che Guevara – Argentinian revolutionary, diary outlined the guerrilla war being fought in Bolivia. Guerrilla Warfare
 Jacques-Antoine-Hippolyte de Guibert

H
 David Hackworth
 Bruce Barrymore Halpenny – Airfields, World War Two, Bomber and Fighter Command
 Thomas X. Hammes
 Victor Davis Hanson
 Gustav Hasford
 Joel Hayward
 Herodotus
 Jonathan House
 Sir Michael Howard

I 

 Kanji Ishiwara – Sekai Saishū Senron (On World Final War)

J
 Jiang Ziya – Six Secret Teachings
 Michael Johns – foreign policy and national security analyst and writer
 Antoine Henri Jomini – General, wrote on the Napoleonic Wars including Precis de l'Art de la Guerre (Precis on the Art of War) and Traité des grandes opérations militaires (Treatise on Grand Military Operations)
 Josephus – The Wars of the Jews
 Ernst Jünger – Storm of Steel

K
 Herman Kahn
 John Keegan – military historian
 Paul Kennedy
 David Kilcullen
 Howard Kippenberger – New Zealand general and military historian
 Henry Kissinger
 Shen Kuo – Dream Pool Essays

L
 John Knox Laughton
 T. E. Lawrence – colloquially known as "Lawrence of Arabia"
 Leo VI the Wise – Byzantine emperor (Taktika)
 "Yank" Levy – author of pamphlet Guerrilla Warfare
 John David Lewis
 B. H. Liddell-Hart – proponent of the "indirect approach"
 William S. Lind
 Liu Bowen – Huolongjing
 Stephen B. Luce
 Edward Luttwack – theorist, identified the 'Dynamic Paradox' of strategy

M
 Douglas Macgregor
 Niccolò Machiavelli – political theorist, The Prince and Dell'arte della guerra (The Art of War)
 Alfred Thayer Mahan – naval strategist
 Dennis Hart Mahan – military theorist and Engineering professor at West Point, wrote Advanced Guard, Outpost and Detachment Service of Troops, with essential Principles of Strategy and Grand Tactics, commonly known as Outpost
 Erich von Manstein – prominent German general in World War II
 Mao Zedong – Chinese leader and guerrilla theorist, On Guerrilla Warfare
 Carlos Marighella – Brazilian "urban guerrilla", Minimanual of the Urban Guerrilla
 Tyrone G. Martin – USS Constitution expert
 Maurice – Byzantine Emperor and traditional author of the military treatise Strategikon
 Frederick Maurice – soldier, military writer
 Maurice of Nassau
 Gordon McCormick – theorist on the "Magic Diamond" model of counter-insurgency
 Steven Metz
 Billy Mitchell
 Helmuth von Moltke the Elder – theorist and strategist; "father" of mission-type tactics and the German field manual for unit commanders
 François-Henri de Montmorency
 Robin Moore – The Hunt for Bin Laden: Task Force Dagger
 Miyamoto Musashi – The Book of Five Rings

N
 Napoleon I of France
 Abdul Haris Nasution
 Sönke Neitzel – author of Soldaten: On Fighting, Killing and Dying
 Michel Ney

O
 Weston Ochse

P
 Sarah C. Paine
 Mason Patrick – Major General, Chief of US Army Air Service and US Army Air Corps, The US in the air
 Ralph Peters
 Ardant du Picq – French military theorist, Battle Studies
 Lucien Poirier
 Polyaenus
 H. John Poole
 Douglas Porch

R
 Sima Rangju – The Methods of the Sima
 Publius Flavius Vegetius Renatus – De Re Militari
 Erwin Rommel – German field marshal during World War II, Infantry Attacks (Infanterie greift an), armored battle theory
 Cornelius Ryan – The Longest Day, A Bridge Too Far, The Last Battle

S
 Philip Sabin
 Thomas Schelling
 Sigismund von Schlichting – 19th-century infantry theorist
 Ayesha Siddiqa
 Lynette Silver
 Richard Simpkin – military theorist
 Thomas Smith
 Vasily Sokolovsky
 David Stahel – military historian with a focus on Operation Barbarossa and the Battle of Moscow
 Hew Strachan – military historian
 Sun Bin – claimed descent from Sun Tzu, and was considered Sun Tzu II, Sun Bin Bing Fa
 Sun Tzu – general, The Art of War
 Alexander Suvorov – general, The Science of Victory

T
 Aeneas Tacticus
 A.J.P. Taylor
 Wallace Terry
 Thucydides – History of the Peloponnesian War
 Eduard Totleben
 Hugh Trenchard
 Yamamoto Tsunetomo – Hagakure
 Barbara Tuchman  – historian
 Mikhail Tukhachevsky

U

 Matthew Uttley

V
 Sebastien le Prestre de Vauban
 Vegetius
 Julius von Verdy du Vernois – 19th-century general and theorist
 Võ Nguyên Giáp – North Vietnamese general who was a key figure in their success in the Vietnam War, decisive in victory at the Battle of Dien Ben Phu

W
 Wang Li – the Master of Ghost Valley
 H. G. Wells
 Bing West – military historian
 Gordon Williamson (writer) military reference books
 Garnet Wolseley
 Wu Qi – Wuzi
Kenneth Wash -- The Final Defense, Flags of Vengeance

X
 Xenophon – Anabasis and Hellenica
 Wang Xiangsui – Unrestricted Warfare

Y
 Jiao Yu

Z
 Zhuge Liang – strategist from The Three Kingdoms era, The General's Garden

See also
 Lists of authors
 Military history
 List of authors in war – writers who served in and wrote about war, including memoirs and fiction
 List of Chinese military texts

References

Lists of writers